The Fletcher Nunataks are two nunataks lying  southwest of Barker Nunatak in the Grossman Nunataks, in Antarctica. They were mapped by the United States Geological Survey (USGS) from U.S. Navy aerial photographs taken 1965–68 and Landsat imagery taken 1973–74, and were named by the Advisory Committee on Antarctic Names after James B. Fletcher, a USGS cartographic technician who, with Kenneth Barker, formed the USGS satellite surveying team at South Pole Station, winter party 1977.

References 

Nunataks of Palmer Land